WYPW-LP (90.1 FM) is a low-powered broadcast radio station licensed to Brandon, Florida, serving Tampa and Hillsborough County in Florida, broadcasting a Top 40 (CHR) format. WYPW-LP is owned and operated by New Media Humanity Association, Inc.

External links
 Power 90.1 Online
 

2015 establishments in Florida
Contemporary hit radio stations in the United States
Hillsborough County, Florida
Radio stations established in 2015
YPW-LP
YPW-LP